There are currently three active coal-fired power stations operating in the United Kingdom. They have a total generating capacity of 3.52GW.

Phase-out of coal in the United Kingdom 
In November 2015, the UK Government announced that all the remaining fourteen coal-fired power stations would be closed by 2025. In November 2017 the UK Government co-founded the Powering Past Coal Alliance. In June 2021, the government said it would end coal power by October 2024.

Ironbridge ceased operations in late 2015. In 2016, three power stations closed at Rugeley, Ferrybridge and Longannet. Eggborough closed in 2018 and was granted consent to convert into a gas fired power station. Lynemouth power station converted to biomass in 2018 and Uskmouth is being converted to an energy from waste plant. Cottam and Aberthaw shut down operations in 2019, Fiddlers Ferry closed in 2020 and Drax stopped burning coal in March 2021.

The United Kingdom had continuously burned coal for the generation of electricity since the opening of Holborn Viaduct power station in 1882. On 21 April 2017, for the first time since 1882, the GB grid had a 24-hour period without any generation from coal power. In May 2019 the GB grid went its first full week without any coal power. In May 2020 the GB grid beat the previous record and did not use coal generation for over a month.

At present, the use of coal power is decreasing to historic lows not seen since before the Industrial Revolution. Coal supplied 1.6% of UK electricity in 2020, down from 30% in 2014. In 2020, coal produced 4.4 TWh of electricity and Britain went 5,202 hours free from coal electricity generation, up from 3,665 hours in 2019 and 1,856 in 2018.

List of active power stations

See also 
 List of active gas fired power stations in the United Kingdom
 List of electricity interconnectors in the uk
 Coal mining in the United Kingdom

References 

Electric power generation in the United Kingdom
Coal-fired power stations in the United Kingdom
Coal
Lists of coal-fired power stations